Héry-sur-Alby (literally Héry on Alby;) is a commune in the Haute-Savoie department in the Auvergne-Rhône-Alpes region in south-eastern France.

Geography
The Chéran forms the commune's eastern border.

Gallery

See also
Communes of the Haute-Savoie department

References

Communes of Haute-Savoie